Trading with the enemy is a legal term of English origin that is used with a number of related meanings. It refers to:
An offence at common law and under statute
A ground for condemnation of ships in prize proceedings
A ground for illegality and nullity in contract

United Kingdom
The statutory offence is now created by section 1 of the Trading with the Enemy Act 1939.

See also
Trading with the Enemy Act

References

Law of war